The German Baltic Sea island of Mährens is uninhabited and lies between the islands of Rügen and Ummanz off the coast of Mecklenburg-Western Pomerania. It is only around 150 × 100 metres across and up to 3 metres above sea level.
Together with its two, rather larger, neighbours, Liebes and Urkevitz, as well as the smaller Wührens, the island lies within the Western Pomerania Lagoon Area National Park and, as a bird reserve, it is out-of-bounds to unauthorised persons.

German islands in the Baltic
Bird reserves in Germany
Ummanz
Islands of Mecklenburg-Western Pomerania